The Cyclo-cross Koppenberg is a cyclo-cross race held in Oudenaarde, Belgium, which is part of the X²O Badkamers Trophy. The cyclo-cross race uses the Koppenberg climb that has been used many times in the Belgian Classic the Tour of Flanders. This is a very steep and cobbled climb that is part of the course of which the riders do eight laps. Fifteen thousand spectators were reported to have watched the 2006 edition of the event which was won by Belgian Sven Nys.

In the 2021 the women edition was renamed the G.P. Jolien Verschueren.

Past winners

Men

Women

References
 Men's results
 Women's results

External links
Official website

Recurring sporting events established in 1988
1988 establishments in Belgium
Cycle races in Belgium
Cyclo-cross races
Sport in East Flanders